Shilpakala Vedika is a  terracotta auditorium and convention centre located in Hyderabad, Telangana, India.

"Shilpa" means sculpture, kala means art, and vedika means platform. Hence it is an art sculpture platform. The convention center includes an auditorium, which is flexible in design and offers a variety of configurations, and is noted for Telugu film audio release functions.

The auditorium
 
Shilpakala Vedika, constructed under government of United Andhra Pradesh in 2001, is located in a  plot, on a  land, with a seating capacity of 2,500. It was inaugurated on 15 June 2002 by then Chief Minister of United Andhra Pradesh, N. Chandrababu Naidu.
C. Rangarajan, then Governor of United Pradesh was the chief guest of the inaugural event.

The facility has a press room, cafeteria, multi-media projection system, and green rooms.

Awards
 ACCE SIMPLEX AWARD 2006 for Innovative Design of Structures other than Industrial structure to S Sathyanarayana, Hyderabad for Design of Silpakala Vedika Multi Purpose Indoor Auditorium.

See also
Film Nagar

References

Buildings and structures in Hyderabad, India
Convention centres in India
Auditoriums in India